Duncan Fraser JP (7 August 190316 September 1977) was Moderator of the General Assembly of the Church of Scotland from 1964 to 1965.

He was born in Bracadale on 7 August 1903, educated at Portree High School and the University of Edinburgh. He was Minister of Invergordon Kirk from 1929 to 1967; and a Naval Chaplain at the nearby shore base. Fraser died on 16 September 1977, aged 74.

References
 

1903 births
People from the Isle of Skye
People educated at Portree High School
Alumni of the University of Edinburgh
20th-century Ministers of the Church of Scotland
Moderators of the General Assembly of the Church of Scotland
Royal Navy chaplains
1977 deaths
Scottish military chaplains